Oaky Creek or Oakey Creek may refer to:

Waterways
In Australia
Cadiangullong Creek (formerly Oaky Creek), in New South Wales
Jeir Creek (formerly Oakey Creek), in New South Wales
Oakey Creek (Australian Capital Territory), in the Australian Capital Territory

Other uses
Oaky Creek coal mine, a mine in Central Queensland, Australia
Oaky Creek, Queensland, a locality in the Scenic Rim Region, Queensland, Australia
Oakey, Queensland, a town initially known as Oakey Creek in the Toowoomba Region, Queensland, Australia
Oakey Creek, Queensland, a locality in the Rockhampton Region, Queensland, Australia